Cecil Tant Sandifer Sr. (August 18, 1923 – December 14, 2022) was an American politician in the state of South Carolina. He was in the South Carolina House of Representatives as a member of the Democratic Party from 1972 to 1980, representing Oconee County. Sandifer served in the United States Army during World War II.  He was a funeral director in Westminster, South Carolina. Sandifer also served as mayor of Westminster, South Carolina. Sandifer died on December 14, 2022, at the age of 99.

References

1923 births
2022 deaths
American funeral directors
Democratic Party members of the South Carolina House of Representatives
Mayors of places in South Carolina
Military personnel from South Carolina
People from Bamberg, South Carolina
People from Westminster, South Carolina
20th-century American politicians